Rafael Daniel Arace Gargaro (born 22 May 1995) is a Venezuelan footballer who plays as a midfielder for club Deportivo Táchira.

References

External links

1995 births
Living people
Venezuelan footballers
Venezuelan expatriate footballers
Deportivo Miranda F.C. players
Caracas FC players
Aragua FC players
Unión Española footballers
Coquimbo Unido footballers
Deportivo Táchira F.C. players
Venezuelan Primera División players
Chilean Primera División players
Venezuelan expatriate sportspeople in Chile
Expatriate footballers in Chile
Association football midfielders
Footballers from Caracas
21st-century Venezuelan people